Sometimes I Wish We Were an Eagle is the second solo album by American musician Bill Callahan under his own name, released on April 14, 2009 via Drag City.

Recording
Sometimes I Wish We Were an Eagle was recorded by John Congleton and arranged by Brian Beattie. In an interview with Uncut, Callahan described the recording of the album:

Reception

Sometimes I Wish We Were an Eagle received very positive reviews from music critics and made several publications' year-end best album lists, notably being named the second best album of 2009 by Mojo magazine.

In 2013, NME listed the album at number 443 on its list of the 500 greatest albums of all time.

Track listing
All songs were written by Bill Callahan.

 "Jim Cain" – 4:39
 "Eid Ma Clack Shaw" – 4:19
 "The Wind and the Dove" – 4:34
 "Rococo Zephyr" – 5:42
 "Too Many Birds" – 5:27
 "My Friend" – 5:12
 "All Thoughts Are Prey to Some Beast" – 5:52
 "Invocation of Ratiocination" – 2:41
 "Faith/Void" – 9:44

Personnel

Musicians
 Bill Callahan – vocals, classical guitar, acoustic steel guitar, electric guitar, piano, Hammond organ, keyboards
 Brian Beattie – electric guitar, pump organ, electric piano, keyboards, percussion, string and horn arrangement
 Luis Martinez – drums
 Bobby Weaver – bass
 Jaime Zuverza – electric guitar

Recording personnel
 John Congleton – recording
 Roger Siebel – mastering

Artwork
 Bill Callahan – lettering and drawings
 Chris Taylor – front photograph

Additional musicians
 Brian Brown – French horn
 Tamara Cauble – violin
 Douglas Edward – violin
 Becki Howard – violin
 Buffi Jacobs – cello
 Maureen Nilsen – violin
 Deanna Sarkar – soprano vocals
 Heather Test – French horn
 Chris Youmans – cello

Charts

Notes

External links
 Sometimes I Wish We Were an Eagle press release from Drag City

2009 albums
Bill Callahan (musician) albums
Drag City (record label) albums